is a Japanese voice actor. He is married to voice actress Keiko Nemoto.

Filmography

Television animation
1990s
 Record of Lodoss War: Chronicles of the Heroic Knight (1998) - Garrack
2000s
 Miami Guns (2000) - Takuro
 One Piece (2000) - Johnny, Mr. 5, Mr. 4, Van Auger, Gedatsu, Yokozuna, Jabra, Gyro, Devil Dias, Vista, others
 Baki the Grappler (2001) - Yuri Chakovsky
 Captain Tsubasa: Road to 2002 (2001) - Hiroshi Jito
 Inuyasha (2002) - Shūran
 Witch Hunter Robin (2002) - Willem
 Groove Adventure Rave (2002) - Franken Billy
 Hungry Heart: Wild Striker (2002) - Kōji Sakai Jefferson
 Air Master (2003) - Baba, Hanai
 FireStorm (2003) - Sam Scott
 Papuwa - Tanno
 Bobobo-bo Bo-bobo (2003) - Geha the Gale, Hiroshi, Indus Civilization, Wan Ronga
 Area 88 (2004) - Greg Gates
 Ginga Densetsu Weed (2005) - Jerome
 Yu-Gi-Oh! Duel Monsters GX (2006) - Professor Cobra
 Onegai My Melody: KuruKuru Shuffle! (2006) - Dar-kun
 Gegege no Kitarō (2007) - Tsurubebi
 Blue Dragon (2007) - Blue Dragon
 Blue Dragon: Trials of the Seven Shadows (2008) - Blue Dragon
2010s
 Kingdom (2012) - Pang Nuan
 Samurai Warriors (2015) - Naoe Kanetsugu
 World Trigger (2015) - Tatsuya Kuruma
 Twin Star Exorcists (2016) - Narumi Ioroi
 Dragon Ball Super (2016) - Great Priest, Rensō
 Black Clover (2017) - Vetto
2020s
 Uchitama?! Have you seen my Tama? (2020) - Tomekichi Kiso
 Digimon Ghost Game (2021) - Unimon, Saberdramon, Sangloupmon, Manticoremon

Unknown date
 Mobile Suit Gundam SEED Destiny: Special Edition - Captain Baba

Theatrical animation
 Princess Arete (2001) - Elder Counsellor, Suitor
 One Piece Movie: The Desert Princess and the Pirates: Adventures in Alabasta (2007) - Mr. 4

Original video animation (OVA)
 Hijikata Toshizō: Shiro no Kiseki (2004) - Takeaki Enomoto
 Iriya no Sora, UFO no Natsu (2005) - Taizō Kawaguchi
 The Prince of Tennis: The National Tournament (2007) - Gin Ishida

Video games
 Langrisser IV (1997) - Krueger
 Langrisser V: The End of Legend (1998) - Marquis Quade
 Samurai Warriors series (2004–present) - Kanetsugu Naoe, Kanbei Kuroda
 Kessen III (2004) - Niwa Nagahide
 Critical Velocity (2005) - Guy
 Soulcalibur III (2005) - Arthur, Girardot Argezas, Li Long
 Dragon Shadow Spell (2007) - Gawain Grandheart
 Warriors Orochi series (2007–present) - Kanetsugu Naoe, Kanbei Kuroda
 Kid Icarus: Uprising (2012) - Hewdraw

Tokusatsu
Kyuukyuu Sentai GoGoFive (1999) - Bushido Psyma Beast Hagakuren (ep. 38)
Kamen Rider OOO Hyper Battle DVD (2011) - Bison Yummy, Shachi-Panda Yummy

Dubbing
Action League Now! - Stinky Diver
Power Rangers In Space - Jakarak
Rocko's Modern Life - Filburt

References

External links
Masaya Takatsuka at Aoni Production 

1969 births
Japanese male video game actors
Japanese male voice actors
Living people
People from Kakogawa, Hyōgo
Male voice actors from Hyōgo Prefecture
20th-century Japanese male actors
21st-century Japanese male actors
Aoni Production voice actors